Hyoseris hirta may refer to two different species of plants:
 Hyoseris hirta (L.) Gaertn., a synonym for Leontodon saxatilis Lam. 
 Hyoseris hirta Balb. ex Willd., a synonym for Crepis bursifolia L.